Blanket on the Ground is a studio album by American country artist, Billie Jo Spears. It was released in February 1975 via United Artists Records and contained ten tracks. It was the seventh studio album of Spears's music career and her first with the United Artists label. The disc featured mostly ballads, many of which were cover tunes. The album was anchored by its title track, which topped the American country chart and became a pop commercial success in several countries. The disc itself reached the top five of the American country albums chart as well. AllMusic later gave the disc four out of five stars.

Background and recording
Billie Jo Spears had been previously known for 1969 single, "Mr. Walker, It's All Over". The song reached the top five of the country charts and was followed by several more releases on Capitol Records. In 1972, Spears underwent vocal chord surgery and her voice was nearly destroyed. However, she recovered from the surgery and signed with United Artists Records. She then began recording her first United Artists album in 1974 under the direction of producer Larry Butler. Sessions for the album were held between August and 1974 at America Studios, located in Nashville, Tennessee. After finishing the project, Spears did not think Butler would include "Blanket on the Ground" on the track listing. However, Butler surprised Spears by including it and releasing it as a single.

Content
Blanket on the Ground consisted of ten tracks. Along with the title track, other new recordings included "Come on Home", "Then Give Him Back to Me", "All I Want Is You" and "Before Your Time". Remaining tracks were covers of popular American country and pop songs of the era. Among them was Charlie Rich's top ten country single, "Since I Fell for You" and Lynn Anderson's top 20 single, "I've Never Loved Anyone More". Also included is Bobby Goldsboro's top ten pop song, "See the Funny Little Clown". The lesser-known pop song, "Permanently Lonely" (originally recorded by Timi Yuro) is also featured.

Release, reception and singles

Blanket on the Ground was released in February 1975 on United Artists Records. It was Spears's seventh studio album and her first with the label. It was distributed as both a vinyl LP and as a cassette. Track listings were identical, with five songs appearing on either side of the discs. The album debuted on the American Billboard Top Country Albums chart in March 1975, peaking at the number four position in May 1975. It was Spears's third album to place on the country albums chart and her first to reach the top ten. 

It was later reviewed favorably by Greg Adams of AllMusic, who gave the disc four out of five stars. Adams found that the album's "best cuts" are on "side two". He highlighted tracks like "See the Funny Little Clown" and "Come on Home". He concluded by commenting, "The remaining songs, mostly ballads, are never less than acceptable, but Spears' voice is always a joy to hear and her performances are consistently fine." 

Two singles were included on the album. The first was Spears's interpretation of "See the Funny Little Clown" (released by United Artists as a single in September 1974). The song only peaked at number 80 on the Billboard Hot Country Songs chart. The title track was the second single included (first issued by United Artists in January 1975). It became Spears's first (and only) number one song on the Billboard country chart, while also reaching number 78 on the Billboard Hot 100. It also became a pop commercial success in Australia, Ireland and the United Kingdom.

Track listing

Personnel
All credits are adapted from the liner notes of Blanket on the Ground.

Musical personel
Tommy Allsup – Bass guitar
Larry Butler – Piano
Ed Bruce – Rhythm guitar
Jimmy Capps – Rhythm Guitar
Jim Colvard – Lead guitar
Pete Drake – Steel guitar
Buddy Harman – Drums
Kenny Malone – Drums
Bob Moore – Bass
George Richey – Piano 
Hargus “Pig” Robbins – Piano 
Billie Jo Spears – Lead vocals
Henry Strzelecki – Bass
Billy Sanford – Lead guitar

Technical personnel
Larry Butler – Producer
Al Clayton – Album photography
Bill Justis – String arrangement
The Jordanaires – Background vocals
Harold Lee – Engineering
Lloyd Ziff – Art direction

Chart performance

Certifications

Release history

References

1975 albums
Albums arranged by Bill Justis
Albums produced by Larry Butler (producer)
Billie Jo Spears albums
United Artists Records albums